"Velocity Girl" / "Absolute Gravity" was the third single released by Scotland-based indie rock band Snow Patrol.  It was released as a double A-side on 9 November 1998 under the Jeepster record label, and had previously appeared on their debut album Songs for Polarbears.

It peaked at #177 in the United Kingdom.

Track listing 
7" Vinyl:
A: "Velocity Girl" - 4:36
A: "Absolute Gravity" - 2:50

Maxi CD:
 "Velocity Girl (Sell Out Edit)" - 3:57
 "Absolute Gravity" - 2:50
 "When You're Right, You're Right (Darth Vader Bringing In His Washing Mix)" - 3:31

Charts

References

External links
Official music video

1998 singles
Snow Patrol songs
Jeepster Records singles